Bowley Sewer is a minor,  long river (brook) and drainage ditch of the Pevensey Levels in Hailsham, Wealden District of East Sussex, England. It is a tributary of Puckeridge Stream, which itself is a tributary of Hurst Haven.

Course 
Located entirely in the civil parish of Hailsham, Bowley Sewer rises in farmland east of Magham Down and flows southerly before turning easterly. After flowing underneath an undesignated road via a culvert, Bowley Sewer resumes its southerly course, receiving the waters of Sackville Sewer before finally flowing into Puckeridge Stream.

References 

Rivers of East Sussex
Rivers of the Pevensey Levels